Victoria Square is a town square and public space in the Quartier International de Montréal (also called the International Quarter) area of downtown Montreal, Quebec, Canada, at the intersection of Beaver Hall Hill and McGill Street. The Square forms an integral component of the city's urban public transit system and constitutes a 'prestige address' for the international face of the city. It is bordered by Viger Street to the north, Saint Jacques Street to the south, Beaver Hall Hill to the west and Square Victoria Street (an extension of McGill Street) along the eastern side. As with other city squares, Square Victoria is open 24 hours per day to all citizens of Montreal and provides the role of an urban breathing space, with dense foliage to the south that tapers as the square rises up Beaver Hall Hill.

History

The square has existed since 1813. Formerly known as Place du Marché-à-Foin and Place des Commissaires, it was renamed for Queen Victoria for the visit of the then-Prince of Wales (later King Edward VII) in 1860.

Victoria Square has undergone many aesthetic changes over its history, functioning at times more as a parking lot, other times as a simple open space, while at others being far more refined and cultivated. The Square was restored to its current configuration in 2002 and 2003. It features Hector Guimard's Art Nouveau outdoor entrance to the Square-Victoria–OACI Metro station, a statue of Queen Victoria, the Tai Chi Single Whip sculpture by Ju Ming, and trees lining its bounding avenues.

Location
The square is now fronted on the east by the CDP Capital Centre, the World Trade Centre Montreal and the Hotel W Montréal, to the west by Tour de la Bourse and Place de la Cité internationale, to the north by the Altoria/Aimia Tower, and to the south by the Quebecor building, its outdated façade fully redesigned.

See also
 Architecture of Montreal
 Monarchy in Quebec
 Royal monuments in Canada

References

External links

Photograph:Victoria Square, circa 1867 - McCord Museum
Photograph:Victoria Square, circa 1877 - McCord Museum
Photograph:Victoria Square, circa 1887 - McCord Museum
Photograph:Victoria Square, circa 1914 - McCord Museum

Downtown Montreal
Monarchy in Canada
Monuments and memorials to Queen Victoria
Old Montreal
Squares in Montreal